Zaugg is a surname. Notable people with the surname include:

Adrian Zaugg (born 1986), South African racing driver
Ernst Zaugg (1934–2016), Swiss sprinter
Hans-Peter Zaugg (born 1952), Swiss football manager and former player
Livia Zaugg (born 1996), Swiss volleyball player
Oliver Zaugg (born 1981), Swiss cyclist
Rémy Zaugg (1943–2005), Swiss painter

See also
Jinelle Zaugg-Siergiej (born 1986), American ice hockey player

Swiss-German surnames
German-language surnames